Darkness, Tell Us is a 1991 horror novel by American writer Richard Laymon.  Originally published by Headline Features, it is currently available in a paperback edition from Leisure Fiction.

Plot summary

While attending a party thrown by one of their English professors, six college students use a Ouija board to contact a spirit that identifies itself only as 'Butler'.  Butler promises the six a treasure if they will go to a remote mountain location called Calamity Peak.  The professor, who knows from experience that messing around with the supernatural can be dangerous, attempts to dissuade them, but the kids steal the board and set off for the mountain anyway.  Once they arrive they are menaced by a machete-wielding killer, and soon begin to wonder if Butler might be trying to harm them.  After discovering that the Ouija board is missing, the professor, along with her lover, sets out to rescue her. Soon, it was revealed that Butler is actually the mother of one of the students, Angela. 

The book contains frankly supernatural elements alongside the more realistic horrors common to Laymon's work (including homicidal maniacs, rape, and childhood sexual abuse).

1991 American novels
Novels by Richard Laymon